An increasing number of refugees and migrants have been entering the United Kingdom illegally by crossing the English Channel in the last decades. The Strait of Dover section between Dover in England and Calais in France represents the shortest sea crossing, and is a long-established shipping route. The shortest distance across the strait, at approximately 20 miles (32 kilometres), is from the South Foreland, northeast of Dover in the English county of Kent, to Cap Gris Nez, a cape near to Calais in the French département of Pas-de-Calais.

Background
Seaborne crossings aboard small boats by would-be refugees and migrants were rare before November 2018. More commonly, they stowed away aboard trains, lorries or ferry boats, a technique that has become more difficult in recent years as British authorities have intensified searches of such vehicles. Prices charged by smugglers for illegal rides across the Channel in lorries, trains and ferries have risen sharply. Rumours that entering and claiming asylum in the UK will become more difficult once Brexit goes into effect circulated in migrant encampments in France, possibly fomented by people smugglers hoping to drum up business.

If migrants arrive in England through illegal means, upon arrival the UK Government is unlikely to reject their claims to asylum. In 2019 at least 1,890 migrants arrived from France via small boats; the Home Office reported that only around 125 were returned to other European countries.

Since November 2018, the number of migrants crossing has grown. The total number of migrants arriving by this route during 2018 was 297. In 2019 and 2020 the numbers grew significantly, and by September 2020 an estimated total of 7,500 had entered Britain by this route. Many arrive in small boats, ferries and may enter the country unnoticed, whilst others are apprehended on landing or are rescued when their craft founders off shore.  

Until the dispersal of the Calais Jungle in 2016, which contained an estimated 3,000 would-be immigrants to the UK, the majority of asylum seekers entering the country via the English Channel did so through the Channel Tunnel, mostly by hiding in vehicles.

Anti-immigration politicians attached the label "crisis" to the sudden increase in seaborne crossings. Former Home Secretary Sajid Javid preferred to describe the increase in crossings as a "major incident." Journalist and former Scottish Labour Party MP Tom Harris argues that the small boat crossings that are occurring are not a "crisis."

Refugees and migrants

Numbers

2018
539 refugees and migrants are documented to have "tried to reach Britain on small boats" in 2018; many, however, were intercepted and returned to France. 434 migrants are known to have made the crossing in small boats in October, November and December 2018, 100 in November 2018, 230 in December.

Following the surge in migrant crossing incidents in November and December, on 28 December 2018 the UK Home secretary declared a major incident regarding refugees attempting to cross the channel.

227 refugees and migrants were intercepted and returned to the continent by French authorities in 2018, "at least" 95 refugees and migrants in December alone.

By way of comparison, 26,547 asylum claims were filed by would be refugees in the UK in 2017.

2019
During the course of 2019, almost 1,900 had made the crossing by the end of the year. From July to December 2019, an average of approximately 200 people made the crossing per month.

2020
In April 2020, boat arrivals for that month was over 400 – the highest monthly total ever recorded.

In July, the number of people crossing almost matched the combined total of May and June, with more migrants encouraged by good weather and calm seas.

In August, it was reported that in 2020 so far almost 4,000 people had crossed the Channel illegally, using at least 300 small boats. On 6 August a record number of migrants arrived, at least 235. It has also been observed that while it was originally mostly men that were arriving, young children and pregnant women and babies are now often among those arriving.

The total number of migrants recorded to have crossed into the UK so far in 2020 was 3,948 as of 7 August.

According to analysis by PA Media, the number of migrants reaching the UK shore has gone beyond 4,100 people in 2020. The Home Office confirmed that 151 migrants came ashore on 8 August. French authorities claimed that in the first six months of 2020, the number of migrants crossing the English Channel increased by five times, as compared to the last year.

On 19 August a Sudanese boy, Abdulfatah Hamdallah, drowned in the Channel making the journey from France. He died after his and his friend's inflatable dinghy, which they were powering using shovels as oars, capsized. While his companion and British news media claimed he was 16 years old, Boulogne-Sur-Mer's deputy public prosecutor Philippe Sabatier said a travel document provided by Mr Hamdallah gave his age as 28. The pair had previously been living in the Calais Jungle for at least two months prior.

By 20 October, the total number of crossings in 2020 reached 7,294.

On 27 October, a Kurdish-Iranian family of five from Sardasht died after a boat capsized outside France on way to reach the UK. Artin Irannezhad, a 15 month old toddler from the shipwreck, washed up on Karmøy island on 1 January 2021.

By the end of the year, about 635 boats had crossed the Channel, carrying 8,438 people.

2021
Illegal crossings continued in 2021, including 103 people on 10 January and 77 people on 24 February.

On 19 July 430 people crossed the channel, making it the largest crossing on record. 1,850 people had crossed in July alone, which is more than the total for the whole of 2019.

On 11 November, a new record daily number of migrant crossings occurred, with around 1,000 people intercepted by border patrols. The cumulative total of 23,000 for the year was reported as far higher than previous years.

On 24 November, the deadliest incident on record occurred. An inflatable dinghy carrying 30 migrants capsized while attempting to reach the UK, resulting in 27 deaths and one person missing. The victims included a pregnant woman and three children.

2022
On one day in January, 271 migrants crossed the Channel.

In March 2022, More than 3,000 people arrived in small boats, compared to 831 in March 2021, with 4,559 making the crossing so far this year.

In the first week of August 1,886 people crossed the Channel.

On 14 August, government figures showed that 20,000 people had crossed the channel in small boats since the start of the year. They stated 60,000 were expected to make the crossing in 2022.

On 22 August, a total of 1,295 migrants crossed the Channel in 27 boats, setting a new record for crossings in a single day.

As at 30 October, the total for the year of 2022 stood at 39,430.

Numbers

Countries of origin 

In early 2019, it was reported that many of the people making the small boat crossings were from Iran. In the first half of 2022, Albanians made up 18% of recorded arrivals, Afghans 18% and Iranians 15%. In August 2022, it was reported that British government officials believed that Albanians now made up 50 to 60% of small boat migrant arrivals, with 1,727 Albanian arrivals recorded in May and June 2022 compared to only 898 between 2018 and 2021.

Smuggling gangs
Crossings are usually arranged by smugglers who charge between £3,000 and £6,000 for a crossing attempt in a small boat. The smugglers often use stolen boats for the crossings.

On 2 January 2019 the National Crime Agency announced the arrest of a 33-year-old Iranian and a 24-year-old Briton in Manchester on suspicion of arranging the "illegal movement of migrants" across the English Channel.

Deaths 

According to the International Organization for Migration, at least 52 migrants drowned in the English Channel trying to reach the UK between 2018 and 2022.

November 2021 English Channel disaster

On 24 November 2021, 27 migrants drowned whilst trying to cross the English Channel from France to the United Kingdom in an inflatable dinghy. PM Boris Johnson called an emergency COBRA meeting in order to discuss the issue.

December 2022 English Channel incident

On 14 December 2022, four migrants died and more than 40 were rescued after a small boat began sinking in ice-cold waters off the coast of Dungeness in the middle of the night.

Responses

Government response
In December 2018 Home Secretary Sajid Javid cut short a family holiday to deal with the small boat crossings. On 31 December 2018 Javid reversed a previous refusal to station additional Border Force cutters in the Channel to intercept migrant small craft on the grounds that the cutters would become a "magnet" for migrants to attempt the crossing in the hope that their boats would be intercepted and enabled to apply for asylum. In agreeing to send more patrol boats, Javid promised to do "everything we can" to make sure that small boat migration "is not a success", including returning would-be migrants to France. Cutters were reassigned from Gibraltar and the Mediterranean to carry out the channel mission.

Javid has stated that migrants crossing the Channel from France or Belgium are not "genuine" asylum seekers, since they are already residing in a safe country.

In response to the increase in arrivals due to calm seas in July and August 2020, Javid's successor as Home Secretary, Priti Patel, was reportedly "furious" and responded by saying she planned to make the English Channel an "unviable" route into the UK. She sought military assistance from the Royal Navy to prevent migrant vessels from leaving France.

On 10 August 2020, then Prime Minister Boris Johnson made a statement: 

On 7 September 2020, the UK government deployed the Thales Watchkeeper WK450, a sophisticated military unmanned aerial vehicle (UAV) to patrol the English Channel. The drones will relay information to both French and British border authorities, who can then intercept the crossings.

In January 2021, all counter-migration operations in the English Channel were placed under the command of the Royal Navy and Operation Isotrope was launched.

In March 2021, the Home Office published a New Plan for Immigration Policy Statement, which included proposals to reform the immigration system, including the possibility of offshore processing of undocumented immigrants. In April 2021, 192 refugee, human rights, and other groups signed a letter which described these proposals as "vague, unworkable, cruel and potentially unlawful".

British public
According to a poll regarding use of the military to patrol the English Channel conducted by YouGov in August 2020, 73% of Britons thought the crossings to be a serious issue. Conservative voters were most concerned, with 97% thinking it serious, whereas Labour voters were least concerned, with 49%.

International responses
After Abdulfatah Hamdallah drowned and washed up on French shores near Calais, French National Assembly MP for Calais Pierre-Henri Dumont blamed the UK government for the death because of their refusal to accept asylum claims from outside the country. He also stated that migrants in Calais "do not want to seek asylum in France" and "refuse state support", preferring to "risk their lives" in rafts.

See also
 2015 European migrant crisis
 France–UK border
 Operation Mare Nostrum (Italy)
 Operation Sovereign Borders
 Operation Triton
 Rwanda asylum plan

References

Further reading
 
 
 
 
 
 
 
 

Migrant crises
2010s in the European Union
2018 in the United Kingdom
2019 in the United Kingdom
European migrant crisis
Maritime incidents related to the European migrant crisis